Eduardo Dualde Santos de Lamadrid (1 December 1933 in Barcelona – 12 June 1989 in Tortosa) was a Spanish field hockey player who competed in the 1960 Summer Olympics and in the 1964 Summer Olympics. His elder brother Joaquín Dualde and cousin Ignacio Macaya were also international hockey players.

References

External links
 

1933 births
1989 deaths
Spanish male field hockey players
Olympic field hockey players of Spain
Field hockey players at the 1960 Summer Olympics
Field hockey players at the 1964 Summer Olympics
Olympic bronze medalists for Spain
Olympic medalists in field hockey
Field hockey players from Barcelona
Medalists at the 1960 Summer Olympics